Alexandre Ndoye (born March 28, 1992) is a French basketball player who played for French Pro A League club Le Havre. Ndoye was born in Argenteuil, France.

References

French men's basketball players
Sportspeople from Argenteuil
1992 births
Living people
21st-century French people